Zi:Kill (stylized as ZI:KILL or ZI÷KILL) was a Japanese visual kei rock band active from 1987 to 1994. The core members were vocalist Tusk, bassist Seiichi and guitarist Ken. Zi:Kill achieved moderate success, with their three major label studio albums reaching the top ten on the Oricon chart. They were featured in a chapter of Karl Taro Greenfeld's novel Speed Tribes that documents the writer's time spent with the band and the events that nearly caused their break up.

History

Early years and rise: 1987–1991
Zi:Kill (originally called G-Kill) was formed in November 1987 with Ken on guitar and Seiichi on bass. Tusk joined in February 1988 and soon after Masami joined on drums. On April 20 they played their first show at Meguro Rokumeikan. In 1989 they released their first album, Shin Sekai ~Real of the World~ on the label Ghost Disc. The album was reissued on July 21, this time distributed by Extasy Records, whose founder Yoshiki was introduced to the band by his X Japan bandmate hide, and with the extra track "Karei". After a May 3 concert at Meguro Live Station Masami left the group.

Their first album proved to be successful, with the band becoming one of the more popular groups in Japan's emerging visual kei scene. After recruiting new drummer Yukihiro and signing to Extasy, they released their second album Close Dance in 1990. The album was an even greater success; it reached the first position of Oricon's indies chart, with 30,000 copies pre-ordered. During an October 10 show at Shibuya Kōkaidō, Zi:Kill announced their signing with major label Toshiba EMI, who also gave the band their own label, Planet Earth.

After a small tour Zi:Kill went to London, where they worked on their major label debut. The group had become known for infighting within the band, and upon completing the album, Yukihiro was fired at a December 28, 1990 gig at Kawasaki Club Citta.

Desert Town, their major label debut, appeared to be the bands breakthrough album when it was released in 1991. It hit the Oricon top ten, and their debut single "Lonely" sold 40,000 copies. In 2004, it was named one of the top albums from 1989 to 1998 in an issue of the music magazine Band Yarouze. However, after recruiting new drummer Tetsu and starting a nationwide tour, the band began a bitter dispute with Toshiba EMI that led to Zi:Kill leaving the label. The band ceased promotion of Desert Town, spending the rest of the year playing only a handful of shows. On September 24, 1991 Tetsu announced he was leaving the group. The single "Hero" was released three days later, with Sceana of Kamaitachi providing backing vocals on the B-side "Your Face".

Regrouping and final years: 1992–1994
In January 1992, Zi:Kill announced they had resumed activity with new drummer Eby. As free agents they collaborated with Extasy Records on a history compilation album of songs from their indies albums, along with their newest single "Hero" and new songs "Crack Eye" and "Don't Ask Me!" especially for the record. Tomorrow... was released in 1992 and hit number 34 on the Oricon charts, a monumental success for an indies album. In retaliation, Toshiba EMI released its own Zi:Kill compilation album, Disgrace - The Best, two months later.

In the Hole, a new album recorded that summer, was released by King Records on October 28, 1992. It hit the 8th position on the Oricon, with "Slow Down" as its lead single. After another national tour, they appeared at Extasy Records' Extasy Summit at the Osaka-jō Hall and Nippon Budokan, and had their own one-man performance at the Budokan on December 17, 1993.

For the recording of 1993's Rocket, Zi:Kill went back to London. Ranking 5th on the Oricon, it marked their highest chart appearance. The single "Calling" was also a success, being used as "Tony's Theme" in the anime Fatal Fury 2: The New Battle.

After a nationwide tour titled Flying Rocket 1993, they performed at the Nippon Budokan again on January 11, 1994. This was their last performance, as in May 1994 Zi:Kill disbanded.

Post Zi:Kill
Ken went on to release a number of solo efforts, featuring ex-Zi:Kill drummers Yukihiro and Eby. He also formed the bands Vast and Cry Baby, but currently is a studio musician and producer. Eby is also a session musician who held supporting roles with Bellzlleb, Shazna, Gackt and currently plays in the band Lizard's Tail, who changed their name to Bordeaux in 2014, with former Aion and Craze singer Kenichi Fujisaki. On September 22, 2013, Eby performed in a special band with Pata, Sex George (Ladies Room), Yoshihiko (heidi.) and Cutt, at a concert in memory of hide.

Ex-drummer Yukihiro went on to form prominent 90's rock band Die in Cries, active 1991–1995. Since 1998 he is drummer for the hugely successful L'Arc-en-Ciel, after he famously replaced Sakura who was arrested for drug possession in 1996. In 2001 he formed his own solo project Acid Android, and formed the supergroup Petit Brabancon in 2021. In 1994 ex-drummer Tetsu formed the short lived band Body, with his fellow ex-D'erlanger member Cipher. In 1995 Seiichi teamed up with them both to form Craze.

Tusk initially formed a solo unit, with ex-Zi:Kill drummer Tetsu and Kyoji Yamamoto of Bow Wow supporting him. He released one single titled "3 Songs" in 1996, but ceased solo activities after its release. He then joined The Slut Banks, who released four albums between 1996 and 2000 before disbanding. Tusk then joined Seiichi and Tetsu in Craze in 2000. He left them in 2005 and in 2007 The Slut Banks reunited.

In 2006 Craze ended activities, Seiichi would join Nakada Band, who later changed their name to The Heavenly Curve, with former members of Deep and By-Sexual's Nao. 2007 brought the revival of D'erlanger, and Tetsu rejoined accordingly. Also in 2007, Seiichi formed Vez with Yana (Zeppet Store), Asaki (Age of Punk, Bug, ex-Guniw Tools) and Futoshi Takagi (Bad Six Babies, ex-Hate Honey). He formed Johnny Loves Brautigan in 2010.

Members
  – guitar (1987–1994, →Solo, Vast, Cry Baby, studio musician)
  – bass (1987–1994, →Craze, Nakata Band/The Heavenly Curve, Vez, Johnny Loves Brautigan)
  – vocals (1988–1994, →Solo, Amnesia, The Slut Banks, Craze, Shinjuku Shin'on Kai [])
  – drums (1992–1994, →studio musician, Lizard's Tail/Bordeaux)

Former members
 Masami – drums (1988–1989, ex:Aura)
 Yukihiro – drums (1989–1990, →Die in Cries, L'Arc-en-Ciel, Acid Android, Petit Brabancon)
  – drums (1991, ex:Saver Tiger, D'erlanger,→Body, Craze)

Discography
Studio albums
 
 Close Dance (March 25, 1990)
 Desert Town (March 20, 1991), Oricon Albums Chart Peak Position: No. 10
 In the Hole (October 28, 1992) No. 8
 Rocket (June 9, 1993) No. 5

Other albums
 Tomorrow... (July 29, 1992, history compilation)
 Disgrace - The Best (September 30, 1992, greatest hits compilation) No. 71
 Best Box (March 16, 1995, greatest hits compilation) No. 16
 Early Best - Final I (September 27, 1995, live album) No. 73
 Still Alive - The Best I (September 3, 1999, greatest hits compilation)

Singles
 "Lonely" (March 6, 1991), Oricon Singles Chart Peak Position: No. 14
 "Hero" (September 27, 1991) No. 26
 "Slow Down" (October 21, 1992) No. 24
 "Calling" (July 21, 1993) No. 51
Also on the Fatal Fury 2: The New Battle soundtrack as "Tony's Theme"
 "Hero" (August 23, 1995, remix versions) No. 70

Others
"Karei" (March 9, 1989)
Distributed for free at a commemorative concert for their debut album.
"Tero" (August 2, 1989)
Distributed for free at a concert called Live On Stage Vol.2.
"Last This Time" (September 2, 1989)
Distributed for free at a concert called Who's Generation.
"Real of the World" (September 28, 1989)
Distributed for free at an Extasy Summit concert.
"Another Side of Rocket" (match 1994)
Nine-track cassette tape given to fan club members.

V/A compilations
 Emergency Express Metal Warning 2 (1989, "Yuuutsu")
 History of Extasy 15th Anniversary (June 21, 2000, "Tero" and "I 4 U")
 Genten (October 6, 2010, "Hero")

VHS
 Desert Town Tour 1991 (October 9, 1991)
 
 Video Rocket London Side (November 26, 1993)
 Video Rocket Tokyo Side (December 22, 1993)
 Live Rocket (March 16, 1994)
 First and Second Step at Budokan (September 2, 1994)

DVDs
 
 Video Rocket London Side (April 4, 2001)
 Live Rocket (April 4, 2001)

Photobook
 A Piece of Road (July 1993)

References

 Zi:Kill History (taken from Best Box compilation booklet)

External links
 Extasy Records Zi:Kill page (Expired)

Visual kei musical groups
Japanese progressive rock groups
Japanese hard rock musical groups
Japanese punk rock groups
Musical groups established in 1987
Musical groups disestablished in 1994
Musical quartets
Musical groups from Kanagawa Prefecture
1994 disestablishments in Japan
King Records (Japan) artists